is a Japanese light novel written by Mamoru Iwasa and released by Kodansha in December 2014. It is a spin-off to Nakaba Suzuki's manga series The Seven Deadly Sins. A manga adaptation, illustrated by Yō Kokukuji, was serialized in Kodansha's Shōnen Magazine Edge from January to August 2017.

Release
The Seven Deadly Sins: Seven Days light novel, written by Mamoru Iwasa, was released by Kodansha on December 26, 2014. A manga adaptation, illustrated by Yō Kokukuji and subtitled , was serialized in Kodansha's shōnen manga magazine Shōnen Magazine Edge from January 17 to August 17, 2017. Kodansha collected its chapters in two tankōbon volumes, released on July 14 and October 17, 2017.

In North America, Kodansha USA announced the English release of the manga in July 2018. The two volumes were released on October 2 and December 4, 2018.

References

Further reading

External links

2014 Japanese novels
The Seven Deadly Sins
Kodansha books
Kodansha manga
Light novels
Shōnen manga